The Gemma Factor is a BBC Three sitcom starring Anna Gilthorpe, Claire King and Gwyneth Powell. The series premiered on Tuesday 9 March 2010, and has six episodes.

Overview
The series is set in a town called Lumb in West Yorkshire, some scenes are set in Halifax and follows Gemma Collinge who "wants to be famous by the time she turns 21." It was filmed around Hebden Bridge and Heptonstall.

References

External links
 

BBC television sitcoms
BBC high definition shows
2010 British television series debuts
2010 British television series endings
2010s British sitcoms
English-language television shows